Dalia Faitelson (born 14 December 1966) is a Denmark-based Israeli composer, vocalist, guitarist, and DJ DaFa.

Biography 
Faitelson is of Israeli descent. She studied at the Rubin Academy of Music and Dance in Jerusalem, followed by the Berklee College of Music in Boston, before she moved to Copenhagen, Denmark. Her music combines jazz, Bertolt Brecht & Kurt Weill, Middle Eastern and Balkan melodies.

Faitelson worked with Randy Brecker, Jerry Bergonzi, Lelo Nika, Adam Nussbaum, Chris Cheek, Marilyn Mazur, Manolo Badrena and Café. She received the Danish equivalent of a Grammy Award for Jazz in 2000 for the album Diamond of the Day and the 2005 Composer of the Year Award given by the Danish Composer Association. In 2014 she was nominated for Best Jazz Vocal Album at the Danish Music Awards for As the World Sleeps and has twice been nominated for the Danish World Music Award with her band Pilpel.

Discography 
 Common Ground (Storyville, 1994)
 On Rising Spirits (Stunt, 1997)
 Diamond of the Day (Stunt, 2001)
 Point of No Return (Stunt, 2001)
 Movable Clouds (Enja, 2004)
 Pilpel (Challenge/Double Moon, 2007)
 Spring Alliance (Calibrated, 2007)
 The Orient West Choir (Gateway, 2011)
 Powered by Life (Losen, 2018)
 As the World Sleeps (Tunecore, 2014)

References

External links 
 
 
 

Living people
Women jazz singers
Women jazz guitarists
Women jazz composers
Berklee College of Music alumni
20th-century Israeli women singers
Israeli women guitarists
1966 births
21st-century Israeli women singers